Atlantik is a 1929 British-made German language drama film directed by Ewald André Dupont and starring Fritz Kortner, Elsa Wagner and Heinrich Schroth. The film is a German language version of the 1929 film Atlantic made at Elstree Studios by British International Pictures. Following the introduction of sound films, leading film companies attempted to cater to different markets by producing multiple-language versions of their films. Atlantic was released in four versions: English, French, German and silent, for cinemas not yet converted to the new format. The film was the first fully talking film to be released in Germany, where it was a major hit. It is based on the play The Berg by Ernest Raymond which itself was based on the Titanic disaster.

Cast
Fritz Kortner as Heinrich Thomas, author 
Elsa Wagner as Anna, his wife 
Heinrich Schroth as Harry von Schroeder 
Julia Serda as Clara, his wife 
Elfriede Borodin as Betty, their daughter 
Lucie Mannheim as Monica, young married couple 
Francis Lederer as Peter, young married couple 
Willi Forst as Poldi 
Hermann Vallentin as Dr. Holtz 
Theodor Loos as Pastor Wagner 
Georg John as Wendt, Thomas' servant 
Philipp Manning as Von Oldenburg, Captain of 'Atlantic' 
Georg August Koch as Lersner, First Officer 
Syd Crossley as Marconi-Telegraphist

References

Bibliography

St. Pierre, Paul Matthew. E.A. Dupont and his Contribution to British Film: Varieté, Moulin Rouge, Piccadilly, Atlantic, Two Worlds, Cape Forlorn. Fairleigh Dickinson University Press, 2010. .

External links

1929 drama films
British black-and-white films
British disaster films
British drama films
Films shot at British International Pictures Studios
British epic films
Films about RMS Titanic
Films à clef
British films based on plays
Films directed by E. A. Dupont
Films set in the 1910s
British multilingual films
Transitional sound films
1920s disaster films
1920s multilingual films
1920s British films